John Willis Traphagan is a mystery novelist and Professor of Human Dimensions of Organizations, Religious Studies, and Anthropology and Mitsubishi Heavy Industries Fellow at the University of Texas at Austin and a Visiting Professor at the Center for International Education at Waseda University. Traphagan's research has largely focused on rural Japan, with most of his research conducted in Iwate Prefecture. He has published extensively on science and culture, aging, health, and life in rural Japan. In the late 2000s, he developed a second stream of research focused on the culture and ethics of space exploration.  He has made significant contributions in the study of risk associated with the search for extraterrestrial intelligence.  

In 2010 he was elected Secretary General of the Japan Anthropology Workshop, the world's largest organization of anthropologists working on Japan, serving until 2014. Traphagan also serves on the Advisory Council of METI (Messaging Extraterrestrial Intelligence) International and the Advisory Board of the College of Fine Arts, Humanities, and Social Sciences at the University of Massachusetts Lowell.

Early life and education
Traphagan was born on December 27, 1961, in Boston, Massachusetts, and grew up in the Boston area, attending public schools in Framingham and Chelmsford, where he graduated from Chelmsford High School.  His father, Willis Traphagan, is Professor Emeritus of Music at the University of Massachusetts Lowell and his mother, Jeanne Elizabeth Long Traphagan (d. 2004), was a professional French Horn player and businesswoman.

Traphagan received his Bachelor's degree in Political Science from the University of Massachusetts Lowell in 1983, his Masters of Arts in Religion and Social Ethics from Yale University in 1986, and his PhD in Anthropology from the University of Pittsburgh in 1997.

Career
Traphagan was an instructor at the University of Pittsburgh Department of Anthropology (1996); National Institute on Aging Postdoctoral Fellow University of Michigan(1997-1999); a research affiliate in the University of Michigan Population Studies Center (1999–2001); and an assistant professor of anthropology at California State University, Fullerton (1999–2001).

Traphagan has been  a visiting research fellow at the University of Tokyo Institute of Oriental.
Studies in 1995–1996; a visiting researching at Iwate University, Morioka, Japan, in 1998; and holds a position as visiting professor at Waseda University in Tokyo.   In 1995–1996 he was a Fulbright Scholar to Japan. 

From 2004 to 2007 he was Director of that Center for East Asian Studies at the University of Texas Austin. He has published over fifty scientific papers in journals such as Ethnology, Research on Aging, the International Journal of Astrobiology, Zygon: Journal of Religion and Science, Alzheimer Disease and Associated Disorder, Acta Astronautica, and the Journal of Anthropological Research.

Other activities
Traphagan is a frequent presenter at national and international symposia on the subjects of Japanese culture, science and society, and aging and health care. He organized the 2000 Cultural Construction of Dementia Conference in Fullerton, California, the 2005 Association for Anthropology and Gerontology Annual Conference in Austin, Texas, and the 2010 Japan Anthropology Workshop 20th Conference in Austin, Texas. He was a co-organizer of the 2004 Japanese Families in a Global Age: Conflict and Change Conference in Pittsburgh.

In 2010 Traphagan was named Secretary General of the Japan Anthropology Workshop.

He is past president of the Association for Anthropology and Gerontology and past editor-in-chief of the Journal of Cross-Cultural Gerontology.

He has written many opinion pieces for publications such as The Diplomat, The Huffington Post, The Austin American Statesman, and Centauri Dreams.  Traphagan is currently a host of the How To Be Wrong  podcast channel on the New Books Network and drummer with the Botolph Jazz Trio.

Selected bibliography

Books
The Blood of Gutoku: A Jack Riddley Mystery in Japan. Balestier Press.  2021. 
Embracing Uncertainty: Future Jazz, That 13th Century Buddhist Monk, and the Invention of Cultures. Sumeru Press.  2021.  .
Science, Culture, and the Search for Life on Other Worlds.  Springer.  2016. .
Extraterrestrial Intelligence and the Human Imagination: SETI at the Intersection of Science, Religion, and Culture.  Springer.  .

 (with P. Nas)

 (with John Knight)

 (with Christopher S. Thompson)
 (with Akiko Hashimoto)
Cosmopolitan Rurality, Depopulation, and Entrepreneurial Ecosystems in 21st Century Japan.  Amherst, NY: Cambria Press.  2020.  .

References

1961 births
Living people
People from Boston
American anthropologists
University of Texas at Austin faculty
Ethnographers
University of Pittsburgh alumni
Yale Divinity School alumni
University of Massachusetts Lowell alumni
University of Michigan fellows
Chelmsford High School alumni